Phlogomera is a monotypic moth genus in the family Erebidae erected by George Hampson in 1914. Its only species, Phlogomera bicolor, was first described by Walter Rothschild in 1913. It is found in New Guinea.

References

Nudariina
Monotypic moth genera
Moths described in 1913
Moths of New Guinea